La Esperanza Airport ,  is an airstrip  north-northeast of Marchigüe, a town in the O'Higgins Region of Chile.

See also

Transport in Chile
List of airports in Chile

References

External links
OpenStreetMap - La Esperanza Airport
OurAirports - La Esperanza Airport
FallingRain - La Esperanza Airport Airport

Airports in O'Higgins Region